Clark W. May (July 14, 1869 – April 25, 1908) was an American politician and Republican President of the West Virginia Senate from Lincoln County and served from 1903 to 1905. He died in 1908 of complications of a leg amputation that he received after an accident in which he fell from a buggy.

References

West Virginia state senators
Presidents of the West Virginia State Senate
West Virginia Attorneys General
1869 births
1908 deaths
19th-century American politicians